Swan Court Shopping Arcade or Swan Courtyard is an open-air shopping centre in the town of Clitheroe in Lancashire, England.

Swan & Royal Inn 

The Swan & Royal is an ancient coaching inn. The Swan Courtyard used to be the stables for the Swan & Royal.

External links 
Ribble Valley Borough Council planning forms
Tea Rooms in the Ribble Valley
Candycopia Website

Clitheroe
Shopping centres in Lancashire
Buildings and structures in Ribble Valley